Accountable Beasts is the third solo album from Black Sabbath drummer Bill Ward. It was released as a digital download on 25 April 2015, 18 years after his previous solo album, When the Bough Breaks.

Background
After recording his second solo album, When the Bough Breaks in 1996, Ward found himself without a record contract or means of publishing the album. During this period, he began work on a third solo album, titled Beyond Aston. When the Bough Breaks was eventually released in 1997, and Ward continued to work on Beyond Aston sporadically for the next number of years. In 2008, Ward started work on Accountable Beasts as a means of taking a break from Beyond Aston. He first announced that he was working on the album in September 2013 and it was released on 25 April 2015.

The song "Straws" was previously given a limited release as a charity single in 2002.

Reception

Track listing

Sources:

Musicians
Bill Ward - vocals, drums, keyboards
Keith Lynch - guitar, bass, keyboards, vocals
Paul Ill - bass
Ronnie Ciago - drums, percussion
Walter Earl - percussion

References

Bill Ward (musician) albums
Black Sabbath
2015 albums